Gay Krant was a Dutch magazine written for the gay community, published every month since 1980. It was published by the Best Publishing Group under leadership of Henk Krol.  The magazine has its headquarters in Amsterdam.

After a bankruptcy in 2013, the magazine was taken over by the companies behind the other gay media Winq, Gay.nl and OUTTV. The Gay Krant then first appeared as a combined edition with homoglossy Winq under the name Winq | Gaykrant, but eventually the indication Gaykrant disappeared and nowadays the magazine is simply called Winq.

Since August 2017, Gaykrant has been re-launched (online only) and is part of the Gaykrant Foundation. The aim is to make all old editions available online.

Gay Krant Award 
 1992 – Jos Brink and Frank Sanders
 1996 – Jan van Kilsdonk
 2000 – Paul de Leeuw
 2004 – Boris Dittrich
 2006 – Will Ferdy

References

External links
De Gay Krant

Dutch-language magazines
LGBT-related magazines published in the Netherlands
Magazines with year of establishment missing
Magazines published in Amsterdam
Magazines established in 1980
Defunct magazines published in the Netherlands
Online magazines with defunct print editions
Magazines disestablished in 2017
Magazines established in 2017